Schools of the Ottawa-Carleton District School Board

Elementary

Carp 
 Huntley Centennial Public School

Gloucester 
 Blossom Park Public School
 Carson Grove Elementary School
 Centennial Public School
 Glen Ogilvie Public School
 Half Moon Bay Public School
 Le Phare Elementary School
 Robert Hopkins Public School
 Sawmill Creek Elementary School
 Steve Maclean Public School

Greely 
 Castor Valley Elementary School
 Greely Elementary School

Kanata
Bridlewood Community Elementary School
Castlefrank Elementary School
Jack Donohue Public School
John Young Elementary School
Katimavik Elementary School
Roch Carrier Elementary
Roland Michener Public
Stephen Leacock Public School|Stephen Leacock Public
W. Erskine Johnston Public
W.O. Mitchell Elementary
South March Public School (Brookside)

Kars
Kars on the Rideau Public

Manotick
Manotick Public

Metcalfe
Metcalfe Public

Navan
Heritage Public School

Nepean
Adrienne Clarkson Elementary School
Barrhaven Public School
Bayshore Public School
Bells Corners Public School
Berrigan Elementary School
Briargreen Public School
Chapman Mills Public School
Farley Mowat Public School
Jockvale Elementary School
Knoxdale Public School
Lakeview Public School
Manordale Public School
Mary Honeywell Elementary School
Meadowlands Public School 
Sir Winston Churchill Public School

North Gower
North Gower-Marlborough Public

Orléans
Avalon Public
Convent Glen Elementary (Convent Glen South Public School)
Dunning-Foubert Elementary
Fallingbrook Community Elementary
Forest Valley Elementary
Henry Larsen Elementary
Heritage Public
Maple Ridge Elementary
Orléans Wood Elementary
Summerside Public
Trillium Elementary

Osgoode
Osgoode Public

Inner Ottawa
Agincourt Public
Alta Vista Public
Arch Street Public
Bayview Public
Broadview Public
Cambridge Street Community Public
Carleton Heights Public
Charles H. Hulse Public
Churchill Alternative School
Clifford Bowey Public
Connaught Public
D. Roy Kennedy Public School
Devonshire Community Public
Dunlop Public School
Elgin Street Public
Elmdale Public
Fielding Drive Public School
First Avenue Public
General Vanier Public
Hawthorne Public
Hilson Avenue Public
Hopewell Avenue Public
Lady Evelyn Alternative
Manor Park Public
Mutchmor Public
Pinecrest Public
Pleasant Park Public
Queen Elizabeth Public School
Queen Mary Street Public
Regina Street Public
Riverview Alternative
Robert Bateman Public
Roberta Bondar Public School
Rockcliffe Park Public School
Severn Avenue Public 
Summit Alternative
Vincent Massey Public
Viscount Alexander Public
W.E. Gowling Public
Woodroffe Avenue Public
York Street Public

Richmond
Richmond Public

Stittsville
A. Lorne Cassidy Elementary School
Stittsville Public
Westwind

Vanier
Robert E. Wilson Public

Woodlawn
Stonecrest Elementary

Intermediate schools
Cedarview Middle School
Emily Carr Middle School
Fisher Park Middle School/Summit Alternative Middle School
Glashan Intermediate School
Glen Cairn Middle School
Goulbourn Middle School
Henry Munro Middle School
Katimavik Middle School
Terry Fox Middle School

Intermediate/High schools
Bell High School
Earl of March Secondary School
Longfields-Davidson Heights Secondary School
Merivale High School
Sir Robert Borden High School

High schools
A.Y.Jackson Secondary School
Adult High School
Brookfield High School
Cairine Wilson Secondary School
Canterbury High School
Colonel By Secondary School
Glebe Collegiate Institute
Gloucester High School
Hillcrest High School
John McCrae Secondary School
Lisgar Collegiate Institute
Nepean High School
Osgoode Township High School
Ottawa Technical Learning Centre
Ridgemont High School
Sir Guy Carleton Secondary School
Sir Wilfrid Laurier Secondary School
South Carleton High School 
West Carleton Secondary School 
Woodroffe High School

Closed
Bronson Avenue Public School (closed 1915; became Borden Public School)
Kent Street (Central) Public School (closed 1966; the school was the first public elementary school to be built in the city and the first to be closed down) 
Borden Public School (closed and demolished 1966)
Wellington Street Public School (closed and demolished)
T.P. Maxwell Public School (now Carlington Community and Health Services)
Brewer Park Public School (became Westboro Academy 1998-2019; now vacant)
Parkway Park Public School (now Bishop Hamilton Montessori School)
Percy Street Public School (closed 1968; a fire by an arsonist destroyed the building in 1979; the school was partially demolished expect for the foundation area which still stands today)
Quarries Public School (closed 1980; later became East Gate Alliance Church, demolished 2013)
Fairfield Public School (closed 1985; became École élémentaire publique Séraphin-Marion until 2002; demolished 2004) 
Bel-Air Public School (closed 1980; now École élémentaire publique Charlotte-Lemieux)
Fisher Park High School (closed June 1987; became Notre Dame High School 1987-1994; now Fisher Park Public School and Summit Alternative School)
Sir John A. MacDonald High School (closed 1987; now St. Paul High School)
Fisher Heights Public School (closed 1988; now Ottawa Islamic School)
Graham Park Public School (closed 1988; became École Maimonides School; demolished 2011)
Borden High School (closed 1990; converted into loft apartments in 2004)
High School Of Commerce (closed 1990; now Adult High School)
Brook Lane Public School (closed 1991; now St. Gregory Catholic School)
Ottawa Technical High School (closed 1992; now Albert Street Education Centre)
Highland Park High School (closed 1992; now Notre Dame High School)
Champlain High School (closed 1993; Connaught Public School used the building in 1993-94 while Connaught's building was getting renovated; now Centre Jules-Léger.)
Confederation High School (closed 1999; now Confederation Education Centre)
Crichton Street Public School (closed 1999; now The School of Dance)
McNabb Park Public School (closed 1999; now Richard Pfaff Alternative School)
Queensway Public School (closed 1999; now Joan of Arc Academy)
Whitehaven Public School (closed 1999; became École élémentaire catholique Terre-des-Jeunes until 2008; now École élémentaire catholique d'enseignement personnalisé Édouard-Bond)
City View Public School (became City View Special Education Centre; now Elizabeth Wyn Wood Secondary Alternate Program)
McArthur High School (closed 2001; now Ottawa Technical Secondary School)
Overbrook Public School (closed 2001; now Counterpoint Academy Day Care)
Lamira Dow Billings Elementary School (closed 2002; now École élémentaire publique Séraphin-Marion)
Meadowview Public School (closed 2004; now Heritage Public School)
Merivale Public School (closed 2004)
Riverview Public School (closed 2004; now Baitun Naseer Mosque)
J. S. Woodsworth Secondary School (closed 2005; now École secondaire publique Deslauriers)
Laurentian High School (closed 2005; demolished 2009)
R. Byrns Curry Public School (closed 2006; now Bayview Public School)
Bayview Public School (relocated to R. Byrns Curry Public School site in 2007; demolished 2009)
Fitzroy Harbour Public School (closed 2006)
Grant Alternative School (relocated to Christie Public School site in 2007; closed 2017, now Maison de la francophonie d'Ottawa)
Christie Public School (closed 2007; became Grant Alternative School 2007-2017; now vacant)
Torbolton Public School (closed 2007; now vacant)
Queenswood Public School (closed 2008; now École élémentaire catholique d'enseignement personnalisé La Source)
Fitzroy Centennial Public School (closed 2009)
McGregor Easson Public School (closed 2010; now Pavillon Sainte-Geneviève)
Parkwood Hills Public School (closed 2010; used by Champman Hills in 2012 and Carleton Heights in 2014)
Munster Elementary School (closed 2015)
Rideau High School (closed 2017)
Elizabeth Park Public School (closed 2017)
Century Public School (closed 2017; used by Elmdale Public School in 2019)
D. Aubrey Moodie Intermediate School (closed 2017)
Leslie Park Public School (closed 2017; now École élémentaire publique Ottawa Ouest)
Greenbank Middle School (closed 2017; now Knoxdale Public School; the school already shared the building with Knoxdale Public School)
J.H. Putman Middle School (closed 2019)

Notes

External links 

 Ottawa-Carleton District School Board
 OCDSB Schools

Ottawa-Carleton District School Board